The 1992 Liga Semi-Pro Divisyen 1 season is the fourth season of Liga Semi-Pro Divisyen 1. A total of 10 teams participated in the season.

Negeri Sembilan and Sarawak were promoted from 1991 Liga Semi-Pro Divisyen 2.

Under the new format, only the top six teams in Divisyen 1 and the Divisyen 2 champions and runners-up will be involved in the Malaysia Cup. Malaysia Cup was played from the quarter-final stage, scheduled for November after the league was finished. The Malaysia Cup quarter-final and semi-final matches will be played on a home and away basis.

The season kicked off on 10 May 1992. Pahang ended up the season by winning the title.

Teams
10 teams competing in the fourth season of Liga Semi-Pro Divisyen 1.

 Pahang (1992 Liga Semi-Pro Divisyen 1 champions)
 Terengganu
 Negeri Sembilan
 Sarawak
 Kuala Lumpur
 Perak
 Johor
 Sabah (1992 MSPFL relegation play-off)
 Singapore (1992 MSPFL relegation)
 Selangor (1992 MSPFL relegation)

League Table:-

1.Pahang  - 27 PTS (1992 Liga Semi-Pro Divisyen 1 champions)

2.Terengganu  - 21 PTS

3.Negeri Sembilan  - 20 PTS

4.Sarawak  - 19 PTS

5.Kuala Lumpur  - 18 PTS

6.Perak  - 17 PTS

7.Johor  - 17 PTS

8.Sabah  - 16 PTS (1992 Liga Semi-Pro relegation play-off) (Relegated to 1993 Liga Semi-Pro Divisyen 2)

9.Singapore  - 13 PTS (Relegated to 1993 Liga Semi-Pro Divisyen 2)

10.Selangor  - 12 PTS (Relegated to 1993 Liga Semi-Pro Divisyen 2)

Champions

References

Liga Semi-Pro Divisyen 1 seasons
1
Malaysia